Daejeon Metro is the rapid transit system of Daejeon, South Korea, operated by the Daejeon Metropolitan Express Transit Corporation (DjeT, or Daejeon Metro). The single-line subway network first opened in 2006 with 12 stations.

History
After the city's administrative district was expanded in 1995, plans were announced in February 1996 for a five-line metro service totaling . Construction of Line 1 began in October 1996 and was scheduled to be completed by 2003, but completion was delayed by right-of-way acquisition and constrained finances in the wake of the 1997 Asian financial crisis.

Lines

Line 1

It opened in two phases and a third is planned:
 16 March 2006: Line 1 Phase 1 opened (Panam ↔ Government Complex)
 17 April 2007: Line 1 Phase 2 complete, fully opened (Panam ↔ Banseok)
 2029: Tentative opening date of extension from Banseok to Government Complex Sejong

The track leads from Banseok Station in Yuseong-gu to Panam Station in Dong-gu.

Line 2

Line 2 has gone through a number of changes and proposals over the years, including making it a maglev modeled after the maglev in the National Science Museum. In 2015, a basic plan was established and the following year they announced the route, which included two demonstration routes that would later be connected, one in an urban area and one in a business area. It is still in the planning stage and is expected to open in 2027. Line 2 will be serviced as a tram.

Network Map

See also
Transportation in South Korea
List of metro systems

References

External links

Official website 
Official website 
Daejeon Real Distance Metro Map, CityRailTransit

 
Metro
Underground rapid transit in South Korea
Train-related introductions in 2006